Gloucester County is a county in the U.S. state of New Jersey. As of the 2020 census, the county was the state's 14th-most-populous county, with a population of 302,294, its highest decennial count ever and an increase of 14,006 (+4.9%) from the 288,288 counted in the 2010 census, which in turn represented an increase of 33,615 (+13.2%) from the 2000 census population of 254,673. Its county seat is Woodbury.

The county's largest city by population was Washington Township which had a population of 48,677 in 2020, while the largest municipality by area was Franklin Township, which covered .

The county is part of the Camden, New Jersey metropolitan division of both the Philadelphia-Camden-Wilmington metropolitan statistical area, and the Delaware Valley combined statistical area.

The county is part of South Jersey region of the state. Gloucester County, along with adjacent Salem County, also in South Jersey, have become an East Coast epicenter for logistics and warehouse construction.

History
The county is named after the city of Gloucester and county of Gloucestershire in England. Woodbury, the county seat, was founded in 1683 and is the county's oldest municipality. National Park in Gloucester County was the site of the American Revolutionary War's Battle of Red Bank, where Fort Mercer once stood. It is now the site of Red Bank Battlefield Park in National Park. The remains of the Royal Navy's  were laid in Red Bank Battlefield Park until they were later moved to Gloucester City.

During the colonial era, Gloucester County's main industry sector was agriculture. Woodbury was the site of the county courthouse, the county jail, a Quaker meeting house that is still in existence, and an inn located on the current location of Woodbury Crossings. Due in part to the county's many creeks that lead to the Delaware River and Atlantic Ocean, smuggling was once common in the county.

Geography and climate
Gloucester County is largely comprised of low-lying rivers and coastal plains. The county's lowest elevation is at sea level on the Delaware River.

Climate and weather

The county has a humid subtropical climate (Cfa). Average monthly temperatures in Newfield range from 33.0 °F in January to 76.6 °F in July.

Demographics

Swedesboro and Bridgeport were among the earliest European settlements in New Jersey and were both part of the 17th century New Sweden colony. Gloucester County dates back to May 26, 1686, when courts were established separate from those in Burlington County. On May 17, 1694, the county was officially formed and its boundaries defined as part of West Jersey. Portions of Gloucester County were set off on February 7, 1837 to create Atlantic County. On March 13, 1844, its boundaries were again defined as part of the creation of neighboring Camden County. The county was named for the city of Gloucester and the county of Gloucestershire in the United Kingdom.

2020 census
As of the 2020 United States census, the county's population was 302,294, representing an increase of 14,006 (4.9%) from 288,288 enumerated in the 2010 U.S. census.

2010 census

Economy
Based on 2019 data from the Bureau of Economic Analysis, Gloucester County had a gross domestic product (GDP) of $14.4 billion in 2018, which was the 14th highest among the state's counties and represented an increase of 1.3% over 2018.

Education

Colleges and universities
Rowan University in Glassboro is a public university that was founded in 1923 on a  site donated by the borough.

Rowan College of South Jersey is the county college for Gloucester County. It was established in 1966 as Gloucester County College and opened to students two years later in 1968. Its main campus is in Sewell in Gloucester County; it also operates two satellite campuses in Vineland and Millville, both in Cumberland County.

School districts
School districts in Gloucester County include:

K-12

Clayton Public Schools
Deptford Township Schools
Glassboro Public Schools
Gloucester County Special Services School District
Gloucester County Vocational-Technical School District
Monroe Township Public Schools
Paulsboro Public Schools
Pitman School District
Washington Township Public School District
West Deptford Public Schools
Woodbury Public Schools

Secondary
Clearview Regional High School District
Delsea Regional School District
Gateway Regional School District
Kingsway Regional School District

 Elementary (K-6, except as indicated)

East Greenwich Township School District
Elk Township School District
Franklin Township Public Schools
Greenwich Township School District (K-8)
Harrison Township School District
Logan Township School District (K-8)
Mantua Township School District
National Park School District
South Harrison Township School District
Swedesboro-Woolwich School District – Consolidated
Wenonah School District
Westville School District
Woodbury Heights School District

Vocational school
Gloucester County has a vocational school, the Gloucester County Institute of Technology, a four-year vocational-technical high school in Deptford Township that serves students from across the county and is part of the Gloucester County Vocational-Technical School District, located in Sewell.

Municipalities

Gloucester County's 24 municipalities along with population, housing units and area from the 2010 U.S. census include:

Transportation

Roads and highways
, the county had  of roadways.

Various county, state, U.S. routes, and interstates pass through the county. Major county highways include County Route 534, County Route 536, County Route 538, County Route 544, County Route 551, County Route 553, County Route 555, and County Route 557.

State Routes include Route 41, Route 42, which is part of the North-South Freeway, Route 45, Route 47, Route 55, Route 77, and Route 168. Route 324 is located in Logan Township in the county. The three U.S. routes that traverse the county include: U.S. Route 130 in the northwest, U.S. Route 322 near the county's center, and U.S. Route 40 at the county's southern tip.

The Commodore Barry Bridge crosses the Delaware River, carrying U.S. Route 322 between Chester, Pennsylvania and Logan Township in the county.

The New Jersey Turnpike passes through the county in the northwest and interchanges at Exit 2 in Woolwich Township in the county.

Public transportation
NJ Transit bus service between the county and Philadelphia Greyhound Terminal in Center City Philadelphia is available on the 313 and 315 routes. Additional public transportation in the county includes the 400, 401 (from Salem), 402 (from Pennsville Township), 403, 408, 410 (from Bridgeton), and 412 (from Sewell) routes, and local service is available on the 455 (Cherry Hill to Paulsboro) and 463 (between Woodbury and the Avandale Park/Ride in Winslow Township) routes.

The Glassboro–Camden Line, a proposed  diesel multiple unit (DMU) light rail system to connect with the River LINE and PATCO Speedline in Camden, was initially anticipated to be in operation by 2019. However, a lack of an official sponsor and  funding source have to date delayed the project.

Freight rail
Gloucester County is located in Conrail's South Jersey/Philadelphia Shared Assets Area, freight rail in the county travels along Penns Grove Secondary, the Salem Branch, and the Vineland Secondary. SMS Rail Lines handles interchanges with CSX Transportation and Norfolk Southern Railway.

Port
The Port of Paulsboro is located on the Delaware River and Mantua Creek in and around Paulsboro in the county. Traditionally one of the nation's busiest ports for marine transfer operations of petroleum products, the port is undergoing redevelopment as an adaptable omni port able to handle bulk, breakbulk cargo, and shipping containers. Studies completed in 2012 concluded that the port is well suited to become a center for the manufacture, assembly, and transport of wind turbines and platforms involved in wind power development.

Government

County
Gloucester County is governed by a Board of County Commissioners and includes seven members who are elected at-large to three-year terms of office on a staggered basis in partisan elections, with either two or three seats coming up for election each November. At a reorganization meeting held each January, the Board selects a director and a deputy director from among the members. In 2017, commissioners, then called freeholders, were paid $16,908 annually and the director was paid $17,908. , Gloucester County's Commissioners are 
Director Frank J. DiMarco (D, Deptford Township, term as director ends December 31, 2023; term as commissioner ends 2025), 
Deputy Director Heather Simmons (D, Glassboro, term as deputy director and as commissioner ends 2023),
Lyman J. Barnes (D, Logan Township, 2023), 
Nicholas DeSilvio (R, Franklin Township, 2024), 
Denice DiCarlo (D, West Deptford Township), 2025 
Jim Jefferson (D, Woodbury), 2023) and 
Christopher Konawel Jr. (R, Glassboro, 2024).

Pursuant to Article VII Section II of the Constitution of New Jersey, each county in New Jersey is required to have three elected administrative officials known as constitutional officers. These officials are the County Clerk and County Surrogate, both elected for five-year terms of office, and the County Sheriff, who is elected for a three-year term. Gloucester County's constitutional officers are: 
County Clerk James N. Hogan (D, Franklin Township; 2027), 
Sheriff Jonathan M. Sammons (R, Elk Township; 2024) and 
Surrogate Giuseppe "Joe" Chila (D, Woolwich Township; 2027).

Gloucester County's prosecutor, appointed in March 2020, is Christine A. Hoffman. Along with Cumberland and Salem counties, Gloucester County is part of Vicinage 15 of the New Jersey Superior Court, which is based in Woodbury in Gloucester County; the assignment judge for the vicinage is Benjamin C. Telsey. Gloucester County Courthouse is located in Woodbury.

In February 2022, the Board of Commissioners appointed Denice DiCarlo to fill the seat expiring in December 2022 that had been held by Dan Christy until his resignation the previous month.

Federal representatives
Gloucester County is part of the 1st and 2nd Congressional Districts.

State representatives
The county is part of the 3rd, 4th, and 5th Districts in the New Jersey Legislature.

Politics 

The county leans toward the Democratic Party, though to a slightly lesser degree than the state of New Jersey as a whole. As of October 2021, there were a total of 230,545 registered voters in Gloucester County. Of these, 89,073 (38.6%) were registered as Democrats, 57,779 (25.1%) were registered as Republicans and 80,776 (35.0%) were registered as unaffiliated. There were 2,917 voters (1.3%) registered to other parties.

In the 2008 presidential election, Barack Obama carried Gloucester County by a 12.2% margin over John McCain, while Obama carried the state by 15.5% over McCain. In the 2012 election, Barack Obama carried Gloucester County by an even larger margin, even as his support declined nationwide. In 2016, Donald Trump became the first Republican to win Gloucester County since 1988, when George H. W. Bush won it and New Jersey's electoral votes as well, the last time a Republican has done so. In 2020, Democrat Joe Biden was declared victor in the county in the closest Democratic victory in the county in the last 30 years.

On the state level, the county is far more competitive. In the 2009 gubernatorial election, Republican Chris Christie received 47% of the vote, defeating Democrat Jon Corzine, who received around 43%. In the 2013 gubernatorial election, Republican Chris Christie received 50,640 votes in the county (64.1%), ahead of Democrat Barbara Buono with 27,060 votes (34.2%). However, Gloucester County narrowly opted for Democrat Phil Murphy over Republican Kim Guadagno in the 2017 gubernatorial election. In the 2021 gubernatorial election, the county voted for Republican Jack Ciattarelli over the Democratic incumbent, Governor Phil Murphy, making it one of three counties that Ciattarelli flipped.

Emergency services
Gloucester County is served by the Gloucester County Emergency Management Services (GCEMS), the first county-based EMS agency in New Jersey, which provides emergency services to the municipalities of Clayton, Deptford Township, East Greenwich Township, Elk Township, Franklin Township, Glassboro, Greenwich Township, Harrison Township, Logan Township, Mantua Township, National Park, Newfield, Paulsboro, Pitman, South Harrison Township, Swedesboro, Wenonah, West Deptford Township, Westville, Woolwich Township, Woodbury, and Woodbury Heights.

GCEMS was launched in September 2007 with the goal of providing emergency medical services to county residents within nine minutes from the time of dispatch 90 percent of the time, which is considered to be the gold standard in EMS services. The program currently has twelve ambulances in service around the clock and three power shift ambulances on duty from the hours of 8am to 8pm seven days a week. GCEMS operates three Quick Response Vehicles (QRV) units that based in West Deptford Township, Newfield, and South Harrison Township. The department operates from 16 stations throughout the county. Its administrative offices are located at the county's Emergency Response Center at 1200 North Delsea Drive in Clayton. It was the winner of the 2010 Outstanding Public EMS Agency by the State of New Jersey.

Gloucester County's special weapons and tactics (SWAT) unit includes police officers from Gloucester County and provides  emergency services for SWAT-oriented scenarios, including barricaded and suicidal subjects, hostage rescues, high-risk warrant service, dignitary protection, and counterterrorism responses.

Heroin overdoses
In 2014, heroin overose rate in Gloucester County was 17.3 deaths per 100,000 people, the fourth-highest rate in New Jersey and nearly seven times the national average.

Notable people

 Corey Clement (born 1994), former professional football player, Dallas Cowboys, New York Giants, and Philadelphia Eagles (Glassboro)
 Danielson, American Indie pop band (Clarksboro)
 Linda Fiorentino (born 1958 or 1960), actress (Mantua Township)
 Grace Helbig (born 1985), comedian, actress, author, talk show host, and YouTube personality (Woodbury)
 Michael Johns (born 1964), health care executive, former White House presidential speechwriter, conservative policy analyst and writer (Deptford Township)
 Tara Lipinski (born 1982), Olympic gold medal winner, figure skating (Sewell)
 Bryant McKinnie (born 1979), former professional football player, Baltimore Ravens, Miami Dolphins, and Minnesota Vikings (Woodbury)
 J. Hampton Moore (1864–1950), former mayor of Philadelphia (Woodbury).
 Milt Plum (born 1935), former professional football player, Cleveland Browns, Detroit Lions, Los Angeles Rams, and New York Giants (Westville)
 Jimmy Rollins (born 1978), former professional baseball player, Chicago White Sox, Los Angeles Dodgers, and Philadelphia Phillies (Woolwich Township)
 Stephen Mallozzi (born 2001), NASCAR Camping World Truck Series driver for Reaume Brothers Racing (Swedesboro) 
 Patti Smith (born 1946), punk rock musician (Deptford Township)
 Steve Squyres (born 1956), former professor, Cornell University, and principal investigator of the Mars Exploration Rover mission (Wenonah)
 Charles C. Stratton (1796–1859), New Jersey governor and former Member of Congress (Swedesboro)

Recreation

Gloucester County Historical Society
The Gloucester County Historical Society, founded in 1903, maintains a collection of materials and artifacts related to the history of South Jersey. Hunter–Lawrence–Jessup House in Woodbury displays many of these artifacts.

National protected area
 Great Egg Harbor River (part)

See also

 National Register of Historic Places listings in Gloucester County, New Jersey

References

External links

 
1686 establishments in New Jersey
Geography of the Pine Barrens (New Jersey)
Populated places established in 1686
South Jersey